Radio Kilat 107.7 (DXQB 107.7 MHz) is an FM station owned by Subic Broadcasting Corporation and operated by Kilat RadioKast. Its studio is located at Brgy. Poblacion, Quezon, Bukidnon, and its transmitter is located at Brgy. Butong, Quezon, Bukidnon.

References

External links
Radio Kilat FB Page

Radio stations in Bukidnon
Radio stations established in 2015